Craik may refer to:

People
 Dinah Craik (1826–1887), English novelist
 Donald Craik (1935–1981), Canadian politician
 Fergus I. M. Craik (born 1935), Scottish psychologist
 George Lillie Craik (1798–1866), Scottish man of letters
 Henry Craik (evangelist) (1805–1866), Scottish Hebraist and theologian
 Sir Henry Craik, 1st Baronet (1846–1927), Scottish politician
 James Craik (1730–1814), Physician General of the United States Army
 John Craik-Henderson (1890–1971), British politician
 Kenneth Craik (1914–1945), English philosopher and psychologist
 Stephen Craik (born 1964), British DJ, musician, actor and rapper
 Wendy Craik (born 1949), Australian zoologist and company director
 William Craik (politician) (1761–1814), American politician from Maryland
 William Craik (educationalist) (born 1881), Scottish promoter of independent working class education

Places
 Craik, Scottish Borders
 Craik, Saskatchewan
 Rural Municipality of Craik No. 222, Saskatchewan
 Craik Forest
 James Craik, Argentina, a city in Córdoba, Argentina

Other
 Craik Sustainable Living Project